Greg Meyer (born November 27, 1971), better known by the stage name Darienne Lake, is a drag queen and television personality. Lake began performing in drag in 1990 in Rochester, New York before rising to prominence after competing on the sixth season of RuPaul's Drag Race, placing fourth.

Early life 
Lake was born in Long Island, New York and moved to Rochester at age eleven. At age eighteen, her mother kicked her out of her home due to her sexual orientation; her mother has since apologized.

Career

Early work 
Lake’s drag career began in Rochester, New York following her first year of college in 1990. She was inspired by a drag queen’s performance as Dr. Frank-N-Furter in a local production of The Rocky Horror Picture Show. When her friends put her up in drag, they said she resembled Ricki Lake in Hairspray (1988); the stage name Darienne Lake is an homage to her as well as to the Six Flags Darien Lake amusement park. Lake later appeared on a 1997 episode of The Ricki Lake Show about plus-sized drag queens. Lake's drag mother, Naomi Kane, was also the drag mother of Mrs. Kasha Davis.

Since the 1990s, Lake has been active in the New York drag community and has performed across the United States and internationally. Lake held the title of Miss Gay Rochester in 1998-1999.

In 2003, she appeared in a VH1 documentary about drag titled Boys Will Be Girls, alongside her drag daughter Pandora Boxx, who went on to become a contestant on the second season of RuPaul’s Drag Race as well as the first season of RuPaul's Drag Race All Stars.

Drag Race 

Lake rose to international prominence after winning the fan vote to appear on the sixth season of Drag Race. During the series, Lake won a main challenge (episode three) and ultimately finished the competition in fourth place behind Adore Delano, Courtney Act, and eventual winner Bianca Del Rio.

In 2018, Lake appeared in Hurricane Bianca: From Russia with Hate.

Lake has been praised for her lip syncing skills, having survived three lip syncs for your life on Drag Race. IndieWire wrote that Lake "lip syncs like the rent is due." Vulture ranked Lake as one of the top 100 most powerful drag queens in America in 2019.

Personal life 
In 2020, Lake underwent surgery for melanoma.

Filmography

Film

Television

References

External links
 RuPaul’s DragCon 2016: Meet Darienne Lake (2016),The WOW Report, World of Wonder
 

Living people
1971 births
American drag queens
People from Long Island
RuPaul's Drag Race contestants